Huy Du (Bắc Ninh, 1 December 1926 – 17 December 2007) was a Vietnamese composer, famous for his revolutionary songs, praising the Vietnam Communist Party. He was a recipient of the Hồ Chí Minh Prize in 2000.

References 

1926 births
2007 deaths
People from Bắc Ninh province
Vietnamese composers
Ho Chi Minh Prize recipients